Game 6 of the Deep Blue–Kasparov rematch, played in New York City on May 11, 1997 and starting at 3:00 p.m. EDT, was the last chess game in the 1997 rematch of Deep Blue versus Garry Kasparov.

Deep Blue had been further strengthened from the previous year's match with Kasparov and was unofficially nicknamed "Deeper Blue". Before this game the score was tied at 2½–2½: Kasparov had won the first game, lost the second game, and drawn games 3, 4, and 5 (after having advantageous positions in all three).

The loss marked the first time that a computer had defeated a World Champion in a match of several games. This, as well as the fact that Kasparov had lasted only 19 moves in a game lasting barely more than an hour, attracted much media attention.

The game 

White: Deep Blue  Black: Kasparov  Opening: Caro–Kann Defense, Steinitz Variation (ECO B17)

1. e4 c6
Somewhat atypically, Kasparov plays the solid Caro–Kann Defense. In later matches against computers he opted for 1...e5 or 1...c5, the  Sicilian Defence, Kasparov's usual choice against human opponents.

2. d4 d5 3. Nc3 dxe4 4. Nxe4 Nd7 5. Ng5 (diagram)
This relatively recent innovation breaks one of the classic opening principles ("don't move the same piece twice in the opening"), but puts pressure on the weak f7-square. Kasparov had played this move himself as White at least three times earlier.

5... Ngf6
Not 5...h6 6.Ne6 fxe6 7.Qh5+ g6 8.Qxg6; 6...Qb6 7.Nxf8 Nxf8 8.c3 Bf5 9.Ne2 Nf6 10.a4 N8d7 11.Ng3 Bg6 12.Bd3 and Deep Rybka 3 gives (0.13) advantage to White.

6. Bd3 e6 7. N1f3 h6 (diagram)
A strange choice by Kasparov, one of the most theoretically knowledgeable players in chess history. It has been suggested that it was a blunder and Kasparov got his opening moves mixed up, playing ...h6 a move too early. The normal 7...Bd6 8.Qe2 h6 9.Ne4 Nxe4 10.Qxe4 was played in Kasparov(!)–Kamsky, 1994 and Kasparov–Epishin, 1995, among other games. The upcoming sacrifice is well known to theory and Kasparov must have known about it (in fact, there are some reports that he even wrote an article supporting 8.Nxe6 as a refutation).

Feng-Hsiung Hsu, the system architect of Deep Blue, suggests that it was a deliberate 'anti-computer' move by Kasparov. Objectively speaking, the move may be okay, although the resulting position is very tough for a human player to defend as Black. White's response is very strong, but the computer programs Kasparov was familiar with could not play it properly. Several were specifically forbidden from playing Nxe6, because they lost too easily. So Hsu suggests that Kasparov expected that Deep Blue would either sacrifice the knight and then get into difficulties, or retreat it and lose a tempo.

8. Nxe6
The computer is aided by having this knight sacrifice programmed into its opening book. This move had been played in a number of previous  games, with White achieving a huge plus score. As an indication of how far computer chess has progressed in the 20 years after this match, modern programs deprived of their opening books are able to correctly evaluate Nxe6 as strongest; but at the time this was played it was considered probable based on other programs' performance that it was only the opening book that was responsible for this choice.

8... Qe7
Instead of taking the knight immediately, Kasparov pins the knight to the king in order to give his king a square on d8. However, many annotators have criticized this move and said that Kasparov ought to have taken the knight immediately. Although the black king uses two moves to reach d8 after 8...fxe6 9.Bg6+ Ke7, the black queen can be placed on the superior c7-square.

9. 0-0
White castles so that 9...Qxe6?? loses to 10.Re1, pinning and winning the black queen. Black must now take the knight or he will be a pawn down.

9... fxe6 10. Bg6+ Kd8 11. Bf4 (diagram)
If Black's bishop were on d6 instead of f8, White would not be able to play this. For the sacrificed knight, White's bishops have a stranglehold on Black's position. Black, having moved his king, can no longer castle, his queen is blocking his own bishop, and he has trouble getting out his pieces and making use of his extra knight.

11... b5?
The first new move of the game and Deep Blue must now start thinking on its own. Kasparov's idea is to get some breathing room on his  and prevent White from playing c2–c4. However, this move has been marked as a mistake by Schwartzman, Seirawan, and Rajlich as it weakens the queenside pawn structure and invites White to open lines.

12. a4 Bb7
Keeping lines closed with 12...b4 was mandatory according to Keene, but then 13.c4 would cramp Black's game.

13. Re1 Nd5 14. Bg3 Kc8 15. axb5 cxb5 16. Qd3 Bc6 17. Bf5
White is pounding at Black's e6-pawn and is planning to invade the position with his rooks. Kasparov cannot hold onto all his extra material and must surrender his queen for a rook and a bishop.

17... exf5 18. Rxe7 Bxe7 19. c4 
Black resigns because the white queen will soon invade through c4 or f5, and once Re1 is played, White will have a winning position. A sample line would be: 19...bxc4 20.Qxc4 Nb4 (20...Kb7 21.Qa6 mate!) 21.Re1 Kd8 22.Rxe7 Kxe7 23.Qxb4+.

After the game Kasparov accused the Deep Blue team of cheating (i.e. having a team of human masters to aid the computer). Although Kasparov wanted another rematch, IBM declined and ended their Deep Blue program.

See also 
 List of chess games
 Deep Blue versus Kasparov, 1996, Game 1

References

External links
Commentary on the final game from IBM.com
IBM's Coverage of the entire match
Moves of the game online at www.chessgames.com
Yasser Seirawan's commentary on this game (pdf file)

Chess games
Computer chess
1997 in chess
1997 in New York City
History of chess
May 1997 sports events in the United States
Garry Kasparov